Lukomir is a village in Konjic municipality, in Bosnia and Herzegovina. It consists of two settlements: Donji (Lower) and Gornji (Upper) Lukomir.

Gornji Lukomir
Gornji Lukomir is known for its touristic potential and heritage. It is the highest and most remote village in the entire country.

Characteristics
Lukomir sits at an altitude of 1,495 m. on the Bjelašnica mountain. Stećci originating from the 14th and 15th century exist at the village and suggest that it was inhabited for hundreds of years. The homes in the area are made of stone while their roofs are composed of wooden tiles. The Rakitnica canyon is located nearby and is said by local folklore to be the origin of a dragon.

National monument
Considered significant in terms of quality of natural and cultural-historical landscape, Lukomir (Gornji Lukomir) village and its immediate surrounding is designated as National Monument of Bosnia and Herzegovina.

Donji Lukomir

Donji Lukomir (Lower Lukomir) is part of the village situated some 500 meters below Gornji (Upper), on the steep slopes of the Rakitnica canyon.

In film
Much of the 1990 Yugoslav film Gluvi Barut (Silent Gunpowder) was filmed in Lukomir village and the surrounding Bjelašnica mountain area. 
A documentary entitled Lukomir - Six Months Off directed by Niels van Koevorden was filmed in 2010. It was screened at the Netherlands Film Festival.  It later won the 2010 Documentary Award from Dutch broadcaster VPRO.
The village appears in the film Killing Season as the birthplace of main character Emil Kovač (played by John Travolta).
The music video for single "Dođi" (Come) by Bosnian singer-songwriter Dino Merlin and Slovenian singer-songwriter Senidah was filmed in the village in 2020.

Demographics 
According to the 2013 census, its population was 13, all Bosniaks.

References

Populated places in Konjic
National Monuments of Bosnia and Herzegovina
Medieval Bosnia and Herzegovina architecture